Offenbach an der Queich is a municipality in the Südliche Weinstraße district, in Rhineland-Palatinate, Germany. It is situated on the river Queich, approx. 6 km east of Landau.

Offenbach an der Queich is the seat of the Verbandsgemeinde ("collective municipality") Offenbach an der Queich.

References

Palatinate (region)